The Filmfare Award for Best Supporting Actress is given by Filmfare as part of its annual Filmfare Awards for Hindi films, to recognise a female actor who has delivered an outstanding performance in a supporting role. Although the Filmfare awards started in 1954, awards for the Best Supporting Actress category started the following year 1955.

Winners and nominees

1950s

1960s

1970s

1980s

1990s

2000s

2010s

2020s

Multiple wins and nominations

The following individuals have received two or more Best Supporting Actress awards:

The following individuals have received five or more Best Supporting Actress nominations:

Superlatives

 Five actresses: Nirupa Roy, Farida Jalal, Jaya Bachchan, Rani Mukerji and Supriya Pathak hold the record of maximum awards (3) each.                                 Six actresses have won the award twice; in chronological order, they are Shashikala, Simi Garewal, Raakhee, Rohini Hattangadi, Aruna Irani and Konkona Sen Sharma.
 Four actresses have won the award in consecutive years: Shashikala (1963–1964), Supriya Pathak (1982–1983), Jaya Bachchan (2001–2002), and Konkona Sen Sharma (2007–2008).
 Aruna Irani holds the record of maximum nominations with 10, followed by Raakhee and Shashikala with 8 nominations each, Farida Jalal, Bindu and Rani Mukerji with 7 nominations each, and Rekha with six nominations. 
 Shashikala holds the record of most consecutive nominations with 6 between 1963 and 1967, being nominated twice in 1967, winning twice in 1963 and 1964. 
 Nine actresses hold the record of maximum nominations in a single year. In chronological order, they are: Shubha Khote (1962), Shashikala (1967), Nutan (1974), Bindu (1975), Smita Patil (1984), Sushmita Sen (2000), Rani Mukerji (2005), Konkona Sen Sharma (2008) and Seema Bhargava Pahwa (2018). Among these, Sushmita Sen, Rani Mukerji and Konkona Sen Sharma won the awards in their respective years. The other six thus hold the record of not winning despite having multiple nominations, in a particular year.
 Bindu holds the record of maximum nominations without ever winning, with 7, followed by Waheeda Rehman and Tanvi Azmi with 5 nominations and Reema Lagoo and Ratna Pathak Shah with 4 nominations each.
 Jaya Bachchan, who won 3 awards from 3 nominations, holds the record of winning the maximum awards without ever losing. Bachchan also holds the record of winning the maximum awards in minimum time, winning thrice in four years. She won in 2001, 2002 and 2004. 
 Farrukh Jaffar, in 2021, became the eldest winner at age 88, whilst Ayesha Kapur, became the youngest winner and youngest nominee, at age 11. Kamini Kaushal, in 2020, became the eldest nominee at age 93 for her role in the movie Kabir Singh.
 Karisma Kapoor and Kareena Kapoor are the only siblings who have both won the award.
 There was no repeat winner in the 1950s, on the contrary in the '60s three actresses had two wins, namely, Nirupa Roy, Shashikala and Simi Garewal. Again, '70s had no repeat wins, but Supriya Pathak achieved two consecutive wins in the '80s. Farida Jalal followed suit with two wins in the '90s. Jaya Bachchan took over in the 2000s with three wins. There were no repeat winners in the 2010s. Until now, no one is leading in the 2020s. 
 Vyjayanthimala was the first actress to win both Best Actress and Best Supporting Actress. She was also the first person to refuse a Filmfare Award for her role in Devdas (1955) which then followed by Reena Roy for her role in Apnapan (1977). Both refused it citing that their roles were leading and not supporting.
 Only once have siblings been nominated for the award during the same year: Ratna Pathak and Supriya Pathak in 2011.
 Fourteen actresses who have won both Best Actress and Best Supporting Actress awards include Vyjayanthimala, Raakhee, Padmini Kolhapure, Nutan, Dimple Kapadia, Rekha, Karisma Kapoor, Jaya Bachchan, Madhuri Dixit, Rani Mukerji, Kareena Kapoor, Kangana Ranaut, Priyanka Chopra and Shabana Azmi. Rani Mukerji is the first and only actress to win both these awards in the same year (2005).
 Two actresses were nominated for both Best Actress and Best Supporting Actress awards for the same performance: Nutan for Saudagar (1974) and for Main Tulsi Tere Aangan Ki (1979) and Raakhee for Doosra Aadmi (1978); Nutan won Best Actress award for Main Tulsi Tere Aangan Ki (1979).
 Madhuri Dixit and Rani Mukerji are the overall most nominated performers in the female acting categories, with 17 nominations overall. Dixit has 14 for Best Actress and 3 for Best Supporting Actress, while Mukerji has 10 for Best Actress and 7 for Best Supporting Actress.
 Kareena Kapoor and Priyanka Chopra are the only two actresses to win Filmfare Awards in five different categories, while Kangana Ranaut has won in four categories. All three actresses have won Best Actress, Best Supporting Actress and Best Female Debut awards once each. Kapoor won twice, while Chopra and Ranaut won once each in the Best Actress (Critics) category. Kapoor and Chopra also won one Special Award and one Best Villain Award, respectively. Kapoor, Chopra and Ranaut, thus have 6, 5 and 4 Filmfare Awards respectively.

See also
 Filmfare Awards
 Bollywood
 Cinema of India

References

External links
 Filmfare Nominees and Winners
Filmfare Awards Best Supporting Actress

Supporting Actress
Film awards for supporting actress